Reninge is a town in north-west Belgium in the province of West Flanders with approximately 1,000 inhabitants. Since the reforms of 1977, it is located in the municipality of Lo-Reninge and is part of the Arrondissement of Diksmuide. Its postcode is B-8647.

See also
 West Flanders

External links
Reninge @ City Review

Populated places in West Flanders